Anikha Surendran, also known as Baby Anikha, is an Indian actress known for her work in the Malayalam, Tamil and Telugu film industries. She acted in Kadha Thudarunnu (2010), Yennai Arindhaal (2015) and Viswasam (2019).  She has received awards for acting. She became a lead actress with a telugu film Butta Bomma an official remake of the Malayalam film Kappela.

Early life & education
Anikha was born in Manjeri, Kerala. She was educated at Nazareth School, Manjeri, and at Devagiri CMI Public School, Kozhikode.

Career 
Anikha's debut as a child artist was in the film Kadha Thudarunnu in 2010. Subsequently, she has appeared in Tamil films like Yennai Arindhaal, Viswasam, and the web series Queen. In her first film Chotta Mumbai (2007), she had an uncredited role which appears just for some seconds in climax.

Filmography

Films

Short films

Web series

Music videos

Awards

References

External links

Living people
Year of birth missing (living people)
Actresses from Kerala
Indian film actresses
People from Malappuram district
Manjeri
21st-century Indian child actresses
Child actresses in Malayalam cinema
Child actresses in Tamil cinema
Actresses in Tamil cinema